Lt. Col. Charles "Bazooka Charlie" Carpenter (August 29, 1912 – March 22, 1966) was a United States Army officer and army observation pilot who served in World War II.  He is best remembered for destroying several enemy armored vehicles in his bazooka-equipped L-4 Grasshopper light observation aircraft.

Early life and career
Carpenter was born and raised in the town of Edgington, Illinois.  He graduated from Centre College in Danville, Kentucky.

World War II service
Upon arriving in France in 1944, Carpenter was assigned an L-4 Grasshopper for artillery spotter role and reconnaissance missions. The additional weight of radio and radio operator often exceeded this limit.
Inspired by other L-4 pilots who had installed bazookas as anti-tank armament on their planes, Carpenter added bazooka launchers to his plane as well.

Within a few weeks, on September 20, 1944, during the Battle of Arracourt, Carpenter was credited with knocking out a German armored car and four tanks.  Carpenter's plane, bearing USAAF serial number 43-30426, was known as Rosie the Rocketer (a play on Rosie the Riveter), and his exploits were soon featured in numerous press accounts, including Stars and Stripes, the Associated Press, Popular Science, the New York Sun, and Liberty magazine. Carpenter once told a reporter that his idea of fighting a war was to "attack, attack and then attack again."

After destroying his fifth enemy tank, Carpenter told a Stars and Stripes correspondent that the "word must be getting around to watch out for Cubs with bazookas on them. Every time I show up now they shoot with everything they have. They never used to bother Cubs. Bazookas must be bothering them a bit."

By war's end, Major Carpenter had destroyed or disabled several German armored cars and tanks (he was officially credited with six tanks destroyed).

Postwar service
In 1945, Carpenter became seriously ill and he was diagnosed with Hodgkin disease, and doctors gave him 2 years to live. He was honorably discharged from the U.S. Army service in 1946.  He returned to work as a history teacher at Urbana High School in Urbana, Illinois, where he worked and remained until his death in 1966 at the age of 53.

Rosie the Rocketer
In October 2017, the same L-4H that then-Major Carpenter had flown in World War II was located at the Austrian Aviation Museum (german: Österreichisches Luftfahrtmuseum) at Graz Airport, and was acquired by the Collings Foundation for restoration to its WWII appearance by a restorer in La Pine, Oregon, with the restoration reported as complete on July 4, 2020. The aircraft is now on public display at the Collings Foundation's American Heritage Museum.

References

External links
 YouTube video detailing the history of "Bazooka Charlie's" anti-tank endeavors

1912 births
1966 deaths
United States Army personnel of World War II
Burials in Illinois
Centre College alumni
People from Rock Island County, Illinois
Recipients of the Air Medal
Recipients of the Silver Star
United States Army colonels
United States Army aviators
Military personnel from Illinois